Daian Alberto García (born 15 February 1997) is an Argentine professional footballer who plays as a right winger for Gimnasia y Esgrima.

Career
García joined the ranks of Gimnasia y Esgrima in 2014, following a stint with local club Libertad de Concordia. Manager Pedro Troglio moved García into his senior team in December 2018, selecting him as a substitute in a league fixture at the Estadio Monumental Antonio Vespucio Liberti against River Plate; he later subbed the forward on for his pro debut, with García playing the final twenty-three minutes as they lost 3–1. García spent the 2019–20 season out on loan with Huracán Las Heras in Torneo Federal A, appearing twenty-two times in all competitions whilst scoring against Olimpo and Ferro Carril Oeste.

Career statistics
.

References

External links

1997 births
Living people
People from Concordia, Entre Ríos
Argentine footballers
Association football forwards
Argentine Primera División players
Torneo Federal A players
Club de Gimnasia y Esgrima La Plata footballers
Sportspeople from Entre Ríos Province